Stephen Alan Marglin is an American economist. He is the Walter S. Barker Professor of Economics at Harvard University, a fellow of the Econometric Society, and a founding member of the World Economics Association.

Background
Marglin grew up in a "moderately left-wing" Jewish family and attended Hollywood High School in Los Angeles before moving to Harvard for his university studies in 1955. He earned membership into Phi Beta Kappa, and graduated summa cum laude (1959). He was subsequently honored with a Harvard Junior Fellowship (1960–63), and was later a Guggenheim fellow.

Career
Marglin started out as a neoclassical economist, and was regarded, even while still an undergraduate, as the star of Harvard's economics department. Arthur Maass, the Frank G. Thomson Professor of Government, Emeritus, at Harvard, once remembered how Marglin, "when he was just a senior, wrote two of the best chapters in a book published by a team of graduate students and professors." His exceptional early contributions to neoclassical theory led to his becoming a tenured professor at Harvard in 1968, one of the youngest in the history of the university.

Since the late 1960s, Marglin, following the lead of people such as Samuel Bowles, Herbert Gintis, and Arthur MacEwan, rejected orthodox economics and began expressing dissenting views in his academic work. According to his former teacher, James Duesenberry, Marglin's career subsequently "suffered" because of his department and the  university authorities in general taking a negative view of this change. Economist Brad DeLong noted in a similar vein that the wider community of "Ivy League economists" took a rather dim view of Marglin's post-tenure "deviancy", something that has "not been pretty" to observe.

Marglin has published in areas including the foundations of cost–benefit analysis, the workings of the labor-surplus economy, the organization of production, the relationship between the growth of income and its distribution, and the process of macroeconomic adjustment.

He wrote the widely discussed 1971-1974 paper "What do bosses do?", first published in France by his friend André Gorz, followed by a series of others, in which he argued that

Elsewhere, Marglin argued: "The obstacles to liberating the workplace lie not only in the dominance of classes in whose interest it is to perpetuate the authoritarian workplace, but also in the dominance of the knowledge system that legitimizes the authority of the boss. In this perspective, to liberate the workplace it is hardly sufficient to overthrow capitalism. The commissar turned out to be an even more formidable obstacle to workers' control than the capitalist."

His highly cited and influential work "What do bosses do?" came as part of Marglin's disagreement with fellow Harvard professor David Landes over aspects of the Industrial Revolution; years later, Landes wrote "What do bosses really do?" in reply.

Marglin is critical of those who explicitly set out to deny the normative aspect of economics—something that he believes "really started with the British economist Lionel Robbins"—arguing that opposing ideology is "a methodological error":

Marglin's 21st-century research has included analysis of the foundational assumptions of economics, concentrating on whether they represent universal human values or merely "reflect western culture and history." The Dismal Science (2008) looks at, amongst other things, the manner in which community is steadily gutted as human relations are replaced with market transactions.

Marglin's latest book, Raising Keynes: A Twenty-First-Century General Theory, is scheduled for publication by Harvard University Press in June, 2021. Raising Keynes rescues the central insight of John Maynard Keynes's great work, The General Theory of Employment, Interest and Money, that capitalism left to its own devices has no mechanism for guaranteeing full employment, and that consequently the government must provide a visible hand to work in tandem with the invisible hand of the market. "Rescues" because the mainstream view today is just what it was in the 1930s when Keynes wrote the General Theory: namely, that the problem is imperfections that impede the working of markets, warts on the body of capitalism rather than the body itself.  Over the years the radical, heterodox Keynes was transformed by the mainstream into a super-sophisticated theorist of warts, specifically, a theorist of how capitalism can get stuck if wages are insufficiently flexible.  The wart theory allowed economists to accept some of Keynes's policy insights, in particular the limitations of monetary policy and the necessity for countercyclical fiscal policy in extremis, while rejecting the idea that there is any more serious flaw than the warts themselves.  And, supremely important, restricting the role of government to alleviating the warts is a strictly short-term, limited, endeavor.

Raising Keynes shows how and why the orthodox reading of Keynes is wrong and substantiates Keynes's insight that, even if you strip capitalism of its warts, you still have a system which has no mechanism for reliably producing enough jobs.  We need the government, not on an occasional, intermittent basis, but all the time, in the long run as well as in emergencies.

In line with his view of economics teaching as "extremely narrow and restrictive," for some years Marglin offered an alternative to Greg Mankiw's course in introductory economics.

Partial publications list

Books

 
 
  (Co-editor with Frédérique Apffel-Marglin).
  (Co-editor with Apffel-Marglin).
  (Co-editor with Juliet Schor).

Articles, papers, and chapters

 
 
  (With Peter M. Spiegler).

 
 
 
 
 
  (With Amit Bhaduri).
 
 
 
 
 
 "Origines et fonction de la parcellisation des tâches. À quoi servent les patrons?", in André Gorz (ed.), Critique de la division du travail, Paris, Seuil, 1973, p. 41-89.

Political and other views
A liberal in his earlier years, since the mid-1960s Marglin has been a Leftist, and has even been labelled a Marxist, though he describes himself as Marxist "only in the sense of not being anti-Marx." He identifies as a cultural Jew and a secular humanist, and maintains his practice of Judaism for the sense of community it provides.

Marglin was arrested in 1972 while demonstrating against the Vietnam War. He supported the Occupy movement, and contributed to a teach-in at Occupy Harvard.

Personal life
Marglin is married to Christine Marglin (née Benvenuto). She is the author of Shiksa: The Gentile Woman in the Jewish World and Sex Changes: A Memoir of Marriage, Gender, and Moving On.  Marglin's previous two marriages, to Carol Kurson (died 2020) and Frederique Apffel-Marglin, ended in divorce.  From youngest to oldest, his children (including stepchildren) are Nasia Benvenuto-Ladin, 2021 high-school grad; Yael Benvenuto-Ladin, rising college senior; Gabriel Benvenuto-Ladin, working in theater production; Jessica Marglin, associate professor of Jewish Studies and religion, law, and history; Elizabeth Marglin, freelance writer; David Marglin, attorney; and Marc Weisskopf, professor of environmental epidemiology and physiology.

Notes

Bibliography

 Bruno Tinel (2004), "À quoi servent les patrons?". Marglin et les radicaux américains, Lyon, ENS Editions.

External links

 Interview of Marglin by Cato's Will Wilkinson on Bloggingheads.tv.
 Video of Marglin giving a talk called "The Future of Capitalism" at the New School, 14 February 2008. The occasion was the third annual Robert Heilbroner Memorial Lecture, which was based around Marglin's The Dismal Science.
 
 Marglin discussing "Raising Keynes" at the University of Utah, 2015
 Panel discussion of Thomas Piketty's Capital in the Twenty-First Century

Year of birth missing (living people)
American anti–Vietnam War activists
Economists from California
American socialists
Fellows of the Econometric Society
Harvard University alumni
Harvard University faculty
Jewish American social scientists
Jewish socialists
Living people
People from Los Angeles
20th-century American economists
21st-century American economists